Phuentsholing Gewog (Dzongkha: ཕུན་ཚོགས་གླིང་,Phuentshogling Gewog) is a gewog (village block) of Chukha District, Bhutan. The gewog has an area of 139.8 square kilometres and contains 19 villages. Phuentsholing Gewog is part of Phuentsholing Dungkhag, along with Dala,  Logchina Gewogs and Shampheling Gewog. It is one of the highest populated gewog in Chukha Dzongkhag.

References

Gewogs of Bhutan
Chukha District